Kimberlin is a surname of German origin. Notable people with the surname include:

Charles Kimberlin Brain (born 1931 in Southern Rhodesia), eminent South African paleontologist
Kimberlin Brown (born 1961), Emmy Award-nominated American actress
Brett Kimberlin (born 1954) perpetrator of the Speedway Bombings
Cynthia Tse Kimberlin, American ethnomusicologist
Glen Kimberlin, session musician and songwriter based in Nashville, Tennessee who plays bass
Kevin Kimberlin, chairman of the venture capital firm, Spencer Trask & Co.
Wade A. Kimberlin (born 1970), science-fiction author

References

Surnames of German origin